The St. Mary's Cathedral  also called Zywiec Cathedral is a Catholic Church that follows the Chaldean or Eastern Syriac rite and is located in Diyarbakir in the province of the same name and in southeast Turkey, in a region with a large Kurdish population.

The cathedral is the main church of the Chaldean Catholic Archeparchy of Amida (Archieparchia Amidensis Chaldaeorum) which emerged as eparchy in 1553 in the pontificate of Pope Paul IV and whose last bishop had to leave the place in 1915, it was restored in 1966 with its status Current through the bull "Chaldaici ritus" of Pope Paul VI.

See also
Roman Catholicism in Turkey
St. Mary's Cathedral

References

Eastern Catholic cathedrals in Turkey
Churches in Diyarbakır
Chaldean Catholic cathedrals